Timofey Viktorovich Kritsky (born 24 January 1987) is a Russian former professional road cyclist, who rode professionally between 2010 and 2014 for the ,  and  teams.

Major results

2005
 2nd  Road race, UCI Juniors World Championships
 4th Road race, UEC European Junior Road Championships
2008
 1st Overall Boucle de l'Artois
1st Stage 3
 1st Overall Grand Prix Guillaume Tell
1st Stage 1
 1st Memorial Oleg Dyachenko
 1st Mayor Cup
 1st Stage 3 Les 3 Jours de Vaucluse
 1st Stage 4 Tour Alsace
 UEC European Under-23 Road Championships
2nd  Time trial
3rd  Road race
 2nd Time trial, National Road Championships
 2nd Grand Prix of Moscow
 8th Châteauroux Classic
2009
 1st Overall Five Rings of Moscow
1st Prologue
 1st La Côte Picarde
 1st Stage 6 Tour de l'Avenir
 2nd  Time trial, UEC European Under-23 Road Championships
 2nd Overall Tour de Bretagne
1st Stage 6 (ITT)
 5th Overall Mi-Août Bretonne
1st Stage 2
 5th Gran Premio Città di Camaiore
 10th ZLM Tour
2011
 5th Overall Czech Cycling Tour
 9th Overall Tour of Bulgaria
1st Stages 4 & 8
2013
 1st Stage 3 (TTT) Tour des Fjords
2014
 1st Stage 1 (ITT) Grand Prix Udmurtskaya Pravda
 1st Stage 7 Tour of Qinghai Lake
 1st Stage 7 Vuelta Ciclista a Costa Rica
 8th Overall Tour of Kavkaz
2015
 2nd Maykop–Ulyap–Maykop
 6th Overall Grand Prix of Adygeya
 6th Overall Five Rings of Moscow
 6th Krasnodar–Anapa
 7th Overall Tour of Kuban
 9th Grand Prix of Moscow

References

External links

profile at 

1987 births
Living people
People from Krasnoyarsk Krai
Russian male cyclists
Sportspeople from Krasnoyarsk Krai